Whalers (Swedish: Valfångare) is a 1939 Swedish drama film directed by Anders Henrikson and Tancred Ibsen and starring Allan Bohlin, Tutta Rolf, and Hauk Aabel. It was Rolf's final film.

The film's sets were designed by the art director Arne Åkermark.

Synopsis

The Swedish captain, Allan Bohlin gives passage to Tutta Rolf, who is the daughter of the ship's owner, Hauk Aabel. At this point, the chief mate, Oscar Egede-Nissen, becomes jealous and puts the Swede onto the Norwegian whaling ship Kosmos II, which is heading for the Southern Ocean, with Karl Holter as captain. On board, the two fight.

Cast
 Allan Bohlin as Allan Blom 
 Tutta Rolf as Sonja Jensen 
Oscar Egede-Nissen as Olav Lykke 
 Hauk Aabel as Jensen Sr. 
 Karl Holter as Captain of Kosmos II 
 Artur Rolén as Nisse 
 Erik 'Bullen' Berglund as Mr. Blom 
 Arthur Barking as Store-Knut 
 Georg Løkkeberg as Lieutenant 
 Lilleba Bouchette as Solveig 
 Torsten Hillberg as Captain 
 Johan Hauge as Priest
 Carl-Gunnar Wingård as Cook 
 Titus Vibe-Müller as Jensen Jr. 
 Gunnar Höglund as Knut 
 Arthur Fischer as Leif 
 Magnus Kesster as Alfred

References

Bibliography
 Hans J. Wollstein. Strangers in Hollywood: the History of Scandinavian Actors in American Films from 1910 to World War II. Scarecrow Press, 1994.

External links

1939 films
1930s Swedish-language films
1939 drama films
Films about whaling
Swedish drama films
Films directed by Tancred Ibsen
Swedish black-and-white films
1930s Swedish films